Metro Stokłosy is a station on Line M1 of the Warsaw Metro, located in the Stokłosy neighbourhood of the Ursynów district in south Warsaw at the junction of Aleja KEN, Herbsta Street and Jarzębowskiego Street. It is situated between Imielin and Ursynów stations.

The station was opened on 7 April 1995 as part of the inaugural stretch of the Warsaw Metro, between Kabaty and Politechnika.

References

External links

Railway stations in Poland opened in 1995
Ursynów
Line 1 (Warsaw Metro) stations